Anaïs Delva (born 15 May 1986) is a French singer and actress. She is mainly known for portraying the role of Lucy Westenra in the French stage musical Dracula, l'amour plus fort que la mort and for providing Disney's character Elsa, from the animated movie Frozen, in the French version for the singing and spoken parts as well as in the Canadian French version for the singing parts only.

Musicals 
 Roméo et Juliette, les enfants de Vérone (2009–2010)
 Cendrillon, le spectacle musical (2010–2011)
 Dracula, l'amour plus fort que la mort (2010–2012)
 Robin des Bois : la légende… ou presque ! (2012 and 2018)
 Salut les copains (2012–2014)
 Spamalot (2013–2014)
 Kid Manoir (2013–2014)
 Hansel et Gretel (2014)
 Enooormes (2018)

Discography

Solo

Albums 

 2015 – Anaïs Delva et les princesses Disney
 2019 – Obsidienne
 2019 – Quand J’entends Chanter Noël

Singles 

 2013 – "Libérée, Délivrée" (from Frozen, French dubbed film)
 2013 – "Toi"
 2014 – "Le Petit Sourire" (Stupid/Happy/Pretty)
 2018 – "Partons"

As Maverik

EPs 

 2016 – The Lunatic Bee

References 

1986 births
Living people
People from Bar-le-Duc
21st-century French singers
21st-century French women singers